Lucky Star, The Lucky Star or Lucky Starr may refer to:

Art, entertainment, and media

Anime and manga
 Lucky Star (manga), a manga, anime, and video game series
 "Lucky Star", one of the Angel Frames from the anime and manga series Galaxy Angel

Film
 Lucky Star (1929 film), an American film
 Lucky Star (2013 film), an Indian film
 The Lucky Star (1980 film), a Canadian drama
The Lucky Star (1997 film), a Spanish film

Literature
 Lucky Star (novel), a novel by Cathy Cassidy
 Lucky Starr series, a series of juvenile science fiction stories by Isaac Asimov

Music

Songs
 "Lucky Star" (Madonna song), a 1983 song by Madonna
 "Lucky Star" (Basement Jaxx song), 2003
 "Lucky Star" (Johnson & Häggkvist song), a 2008 song by Andreas Johnson and Carola Häggkvist
 "Lucky Star" (Gene Vincent song), 1961 song
 "Lucky Star" (Superfunk song), a 2000 song by Superfunk, featuring Ron Carroll
 "Lucky Star" (Shinee song), a 2014 song by Shinee
 "Lucky Star", a song by Alex Lloyd from Black the Sun
 "Lucky Star", a song by Elliot Minor from Elliot Minor
"Lucky Star (Ain't What You Are)" is a protest song and music video by Ike Moriz, 2015
 "Lucky Star", a song by Goo Goo Dolls from Superstar Car Wash
 "The Lucky Star", a song by The Brilliant Green from Los Angeles
 "Lucky Star", the ending theme song for the anime Prétear
 "Lucky Star" 2006 single by The Legends

Other music
 Lucky Starr (singer), (born 1940)  stage name of Leslie Morrison, Australian pop singer and TV host
 Lucky Star, a 2004 album by Daniel Siegert
 The theme song(s) to the Lucky Star anime, CD singles, etc. see List of Lucky Star albums

Other art, entertainment and media
 Lucky Star (advertisement), a 2002 advertisement, in the form of a movie trailer, for the Mercedes SL
 Lucky Star, a television station in the United Kingdom
 The Lucky Star, an 1899 English comic opera composed by Ivan Caryll
 "Lucky Star", a common name for an origami design that resembles a small, rounded star

Transportation 
 Lucky Star Bus Lines, a Boston to New York City Chinatown bus line

See also
 Lucky Stars (disambiguation)
 Lucky Strike
 My Lucky Star (disambiguation)
 Shooting Star (disambiguation)
 "When You Wish Upon a Star"
 Wish Upon a Star